Ernest 'Ernie' E. Otten, Jr. (born June 29, 1954) is an American politician and a Republican member of the South Dakota Senate representing District 6 since January 8, 2013.

Elections
2012 With incumbent Senate District 6 Republican Senator Art Fryslie redistricted to District 2, Otten won the June 5, 2012 Republican Primary with 772 votes (58.5%) against Representative and former Senator Gene Abdallah; and won the November 6, 2012 General election with 6,011 votes (65.4%) against Democratic nominee Richard Schriever.
1996 To challenge incumbent Democratic Representative Roland Chicoine, Otten and incumbent Republican Representative Mike Broderick were unopposed for the 1996 Republican Primary, but Otten lost the four-way November 5, 1996 General election, where Representative Broderick took the first seat and Representative Chicoine took the second seat ahead of Otten and Democratic nominee Richard Dubro.

References

External links
Official page at the South Dakota Legislature
Campaign site
 

1954 births
Living people
People from Lincoln County, South Dakota
Politicians from Sioux Falls, South Dakota
Republican Party South Dakota state senators
21st-century American politicians